Géza Hoffmann (26 February 1929 – 18 April 2005) was a Hungarian wrestler. He competed in the men's freestyle featherweight at the 1952 Summer Olympics.

References

External links
 

1929 births
2005 deaths
Hungarian male sport wrestlers
Olympic wrestlers of Hungary
Wrestlers at the 1952 Summer Olympics
People from Hódmezővásárhely
Sportspeople from Csongrád-Csanád County
20th-century Hungarian people